Tayyip Talha Sanuç (born 17 December 1999) is a Turkish professional footballer who plays as a defender for  Süper Lig side Beşiktaş and the Turkey national team.

Professional career
Sanuç is a youth product of Karabükspor, and was promoted to their first team in 2017. He made his professional debut for Karabükspor in a 3-2 Süper Lig victory over Akhisar Belediyespor on 2 June 2017 at the age of 17. On 17 July 2018, he was transferred to Adana Demirspor.

International career
Sanuç is a youth international for Turkey, having played up to the Turkey U23s. He debuted with the senior Turkey national team in a friendly 2–1 win over the Czech Republic on 19 November 2022.

Honours
Adana Demirspor
TFF 1. Lig: 2020–21

Turkey U23
Islamic Solidarity Games: 2021

References

External links
 
 
 
 

Living people
1999 births
People from Karabük
Turkish footballers
Turkey international footballers
Turkey youth international footballers
Süper Lig players
Kardemir Karabükspor footballers
Adana Demirspor footballers
Association football defenders